Melbourne Victory is an association football club based at the Melbourne Rectangular Stadium. The club was formed in 2004 as the first Victorian member admitted into the A-League in 2005. The club has won the A-League Premiership three times, the A-League Championship twice and has competed in the AFC Champions League on three occasions.

Key
Key to league competitions:

 A-League – Australia's top soccer league, established in 2005

Key to colours and symbols:

Key to league record:
 Season = The year and article of the season
 Pos = Final position
 Pld = Games played
 W = Games won
 D = Games drawn
 L = Games lost
 GF = Goals scored
 GA = Goals against
 Pts = Points

Key to cup record:
 En-dash (–) = Melbourne Victory did not participate/cup not held
 R32 = Round of 32
 R16 = Round of 16
 QF = Quarter-finals
 SF = Semi-finals
 RU = Runners-up
 W = Winners

Seasons

References

External links
Ultimate A-League
aleaguestats.com

Melbourne Victory FC seasons
Seasons
Australian soccer club seasons
Melbourne sport-related lists